Donald L. Granitz (August 24, 1928 – January 28, 2016) was a Christian missionary and an American football player and coach. He served as the head football coach at Taylor University in Upland, Indiana from 1952 to 1954. After serving as a missionary in Brazil, Granitz returned to the United States to become the athletic director at Bethel College in Mishawaka, Indiana in 1971.

References

1928 births
2016 deaths
Bethel Pilots athletic directors
Taylor Trojans baseball coaches
Taylor Trojans football coaches
Taylor Trojans football players
People from Ambridge, Pennsylvania
Players of American football from Pennsylvania